Kastri (Attica) is a city quarter in Nea Erythraia in Athens, Greece.

References

External links

Attica